The 2016 CONCACAF Champions League Final was the final of the 2015–16 CONCACAF Champions League, the eighth edition of the CONCACAF Champions League under its current format, and overall the 51st edition of the premium football club competition organized by CONCACAF, the regional governing body of North America, Central America, and the Caribbean.

The final was contested in two-legged home-and-away format between Mexican teams UANL and América. The first leg was hosted by UANL at Estadio Universitario in San Nicolás de los Garza on 20 April 2016, while the second leg was hosted by América at Estadio Azteca in Mexico City on 27 April 2016. The winner earned the right to represent CONCACAF at the 2016 FIFA Club World Cup, entering at the quarterfinal stage.

América defeated UANL 4–1 on aggregate to win their second consecutive and seventh overall CONCACAF club title.

Background
For the sixth time in eight seasons of the CONCACAF Champions League, the final was played between two Mexican sides. This guaranteed a Mexican champion for the eleventh straight year and 32nd time since the confederation began staging the tournament in 1962 (including the tournament's predecessor, the CONCACAF Champions' Cup).

América were the defending champions and also the record holders of six CONCACAF club titles (1977, 1987, 1990, 1992, 2006, 2014–15), which they achieved in last year's final, where they beat the Montreal Impact.

This was the first CONCACAF club final for UANL, although they had played in a continental club final before, where as a guest team they lost in last year's Copa Libertadores final to River Plate.

Road to the final

Note: In all results below, the score of the finalist is given first (H: home; A: away).

Rules
The final was played on a home-and-away two-legged basis, with the higher-seeded team hosting the second leg. The away goals rule would be used if the aggregate score was level after normal time of the second leg, but not after extra time, and so the final would be decided by penalty shoot-out if the aggregate score was level after extra time of the second leg.

Matches

First leg

Summary 
The first leg was held on 20 April at Estadio Universitario in San Nicolás de los Garza.

In the 32nd minute, Tigres had a great chance to open the scoring, but Javier Aquino sent a one on one chance flying over the crossbar. In the 49th minute, Darío Benedetto opened the scoring with a header from close range following a lobbed pass from Osvaldo Martínez. Seven minutes later, Andrés Andrade finished into an empty net from about 40 yards out, but the goal was disallowed for offside. This was a controversial decision because the goalkeeper had rushed out to the halfway line, and replays showed Andrade was inches behind the ball and the goalkeeper when he received it. In the 92nd minute, Oswaldo Martinez scored from long range into the bottom left corner after a counter attack.

Details

Second leg

Summary 
The second leg was played at the Estadio Azteca in Mexico City on 27 April.

In the 38th minute, André-Pierre Gignac scored the first goal of the game with a close range finish into the bottom left corner. In the 67th minute, Michael Arroyo scored from long range into the bottom right, to level the scores, just one minute after being subbed on. In the 87th minute, Oswaldo Martinez drilled a penalty, into the top left corner, after Hugo Ayala fouled Miguel Samudio in the box.

Details 
América won 4–1 on aggregate.

References

External links
CONCACAF Champions League , CONCACAF.com

Finals
Tigres UANL matches
Club América matches
2015–16 in Mexican football
International club association football competitions hosted by Mexico
CONCACAF Champions League finals